Rahul Pandharipande (born 1969) is a mathematician who is currently a professor of mathematics at the Swiss Federal Institute of Technology Zürich (ETH) working in algebraic geometry. His particular interests
concern moduli spaces, enumerative invariants associated to moduli spaces, such as Gromov–Witten invariants and Donaldson–Thomas invariants, and the cohomology of the moduli space of curves. His father Vijay Raghunath Pandharipande was a renowned theoretical physicist who worked in the area of nuclear physics.

Educational and professional history 

He received his A.B. from Princeton University in 1990 and his PhD from Harvard University in 1994 with a thesis entitled `A Compactification over the Moduli Space of Stable Curves of the Universal Moduli Space of Slope-Semistable Vector Bundles'.  His thesis advisor at Harvard was Joe Harris. After teaching at the University of Chicago and the California Institute of Technology, he joined the faculty as Professor of Mathematics at Princeton University in 2002. In 2011, he accepted a Professorship at ETH Zürich.

References

External links 

1969 births
20th-century Indian mathematicians
Academic staff of ETH Zurich
Indian emigrants to the United States
Algebraic geometers
21st-century Indian mathematicians
Harvard University faculty
Living people
Princeton University alumni
Princeton University faculty
People from Amravati
American people of Marathi descent
Harvard University alumni
American people of Indian descent
University Laboratory High School (Urbana, Illinois) alumni